Biskupia Kopa is a mountain in the crest of the Opawskie Mountains, eastern part of the Sudetes, lying on the border between Poland and the Czech Republic. It belongs to the Crown of Polish Mountains and is the highest reaching point of the Opole Voivodeship.

The Biskupia Kopa massif is built of Devonian sedimentary rocks – sandstone and slate. Many excavations in the area have remained after their exploitation, such as Gwarkowa Perć, Piekiełko, Morskie Oczko.

References

Nysa County
Jeseník District
Mountains of Poland
Mountains and hills of the Czech Republic
Czech Republic–Poland border
International mountains of Europe